The 1874 Preston by-election was fought on 24 April 1874.  The byelection was fought due to the incumbent Conservative MP, John Holker, becoming Solicitor General for England and Wales.  It was retained by the incumbent.

References

1874 elections in the United Kingdom
1874 in England
1870s in Lancashire
Elections in Preston
By-elections to the Parliament of the United Kingdom in Lancashire constituencies
Unopposed ministerial by-elections to the Parliament of the United Kingdom in English constituencies
April 1874 events